is a Japanese four-panel manga series by Fumi Ayamiya. It was first published on September 15, 2017, via a web comic distribution site GANMA! at Comic Smart. The story focuses at the daily life of Kautz, a new shopkeeper at an armor shop that only sells sexy, revealing armors for female adventurers that equipped with high stats and sold cheap prices, causing the shop's finance to get worsened that he has to manage it somehow while dealing with his co-worker and customers. The first volume of the manga was released on November 12, 2018, by Earth Star Entertainment.

A short anime adaptation by IMAGICA Lab aired from October 9 to December 25, 2018. Each episodes is 4 minutes length. The anime was broadcast on Tokyo MX and BS11, and is available on Ganma! app and AbemaTV service. There are also three additional episodes that were released from March 6 to March 20, 2019. A second season aired from January 2 to March 20, 2021.

Characters

The main hero of the series. He is the one who seeks a job.

A young woman who works at the shop as well, often serving as a model and test subject for various armors.

The owner of the shop. He is very serious in nature.

A frequent customer to the shop, she loves to tease Kautsu. She is also a powerful sword woman as well.

A very powerful demon lord that takes the guise of a young girl.

A cross-dressing elf and occasional customer to the shop.

A sorceress and occasional customer to the shop.

Media

Manga
It was first published on September 15, 2017, via a web comic distribution site GANMA! at Comic Smart. The first volume of the manga was released on November 12, 2018, by Earth Star Entertainment.

Volume list

Anime
Jun'ichi Yamamoto directed the series with anime production by IMAGICA Lab. Series scripts were handled by both Yamamoto and Domeshi. Kosuke Iwanaga designed the characters, while the in-game characters were designed by Kyashii. Keiji Inai composed the music. The anime features narration by cosplayer Enako. There is also a three episode OVA that continues the series.

A 12-episode second season has been announced, and aired from January 2 to March 20, 2021. The cast and staff members are returning to reprise their roles.

Crunchyroll will stream the second season as it releases and add the first at a later date.

Episode list

Armor Shop for Ladies & Gentlemen

Armor Shop for Ladies & Gentlemen Flips the Script

Armor Shop for Ladies & Gentlemen II

Notes

References

External links
Manga official website 
Anime official website 

2017 manga
2018 anime ONAs
2018 web series debuts
2021 anime ONAs
Comedy anime and manga
Crunchyroll anime
Earth Star Entertainment manga
Fantasy anime and manga
Japanese comic strips
Shōnen manga
Sword and sorcery anime and manga
Yonkoma